is a 2021 Japanese animated action fantasy film based on the Pretty Cure franchise created by Izumi Todo, and its seventeenth series, Healin' Good Pretty Cure. The film is directed by Ryōta Nakamura, written by Ryunosuke Kingetsu, and produced by Toei Animation. The film was released in Japan on March 20, 2021, as a double feature, with a 5-minute short film, .

Featuring the Pretty Cure teams from Yes! PreCure 5 GoGo!, Nodoka and others explore Tokyo using a "Dream Pendant", while encountering a monster named Ego Ego.

Plot
Nodoka, Chiyu, Hinata and Asumi arrives to Tokyo, and experiences virtual dream-like reality using the "Dream Pendant" via Dream Arle system. There, Nodoka encounters a girl named Kaguya, a popular model of Dream Arle. Later that night, at a special stage in the middle of the city, Kaguya is attacked by a fox-like monster named Ego Ego. Nodoka and the others transform and fight, but the monster multiplies. Then, the Yes! PreCure 5 GoGo! team: Cures Dream, Rouge, Lemonade, Mint, Aqua and Milky Rose appears and assist the Healin' Good team. After Ego Ego is defeated, he escapes, and Yes! 5 team continues their pursuit, but not long before promising Nodoka and the others to meet the next morning.

The next morning, Kaguya invites Nodoka and the others to a stadium, and each uses their Dream Pendants individually. Later, Nodoka and the others plan Kaguya's birthday party, while Kaguya is shocked to learn that her mother, Sarena has captured the Yes! 5 team. Sarena reveals that she's using the team's flower buds to make the Miracle Flower bloom, but still in disbelief, Kaguya runs away. Nodoka and the others are summoned by Kaguya via Dream Whale, and reveals that Kaguya is a spirit of the Miracle Flower. Soon after, Ego Ego returns and steals the townspeople's flower buds, including Nodoka's mother. Determined to save them and Kaguya, they transform with their partners, gaining the partner forms and chases after Ego Ego.

While fighting the Ego Ego, Grace and others learns that Kaguya is suffering from poor condition, and Sarena is attempting to use the Miracle Flower to save her. However, Ego Ego reveals that he wants the Miracle Flower for himself, but Grace and the others, including re-awakened Yes! 5 team briefly stops him. In his last effort, Ego Ego absorbs Kaguya and attacks both teams. With Grace and Dream's flower buds shining, other Cures sends their powers, transforming both Cures into Dream Cure Grace, and defeats Ego Ego with "Healin' Good Dream". Kaguya is slowly fading away, but Grace asks the city to use the power of their Virtual Dreams. The city lights up, and with Sarena's emotions, Grace transforms into Kaguya Grace and purifies Kaguya.

Kaguya wakes up, now as a human girl surrounded by flowers, and Sarena wishes her daughter Happy Birthday.

Voice cast

Aoi Yūki as Nodoka Hanadera/Cure Grace
Natsu Yorita as Chiyu Sawaizumi/Cure Fontaine
Hiyori Kono as Hinata Hiramitsu/Cure Sparkle
Suzuko Mimori as Asumi Fuurin/Cure Earth
Ai Kakuma as Rabirin
Hana Takeda as Pegitan
Aki Kanada as Nyatoran
Haruka Shiraishi as Rate
Seiran Kobayashi as Kaguya
Masako Katsuki as Sarena Gashuuin
Wataru Takagi as Ego Ego
Kazusa Murai as Yasuko Hanadera
Yūko Sanpei as Nozomi Yumehara/Cure Dream
Junko Takeuchi as Rin Natsuki/Cure Rouge
Mariya Ise as Urara Kasugano/Cure Lemonade
Ai Nagano as Komachi Akimoto/Cure Mint
Ai Maeda as Karen Minazuki/Cure Aqua
Eri Sendai as Milk/Kurumi Mimino/Milky Rose
Takeshi Kusao as Coco
Miyu Irino as Natsu

Nicole Fujita, Meru Nukumi, and Hina Kagei made cameo appearances as themselves.

Production
In October 2020, the day Pretty Cure Miracle Leap: A Wonderful Day with Everyone premiered, it was announced that a film based on Healin' Good Pretty Cure was in the works, and will feature main Pretty Cure teams from Yes! PreCure 5 GoGo!. On December of that year, it was announced that Ryōta Nakamura will direct the film, with Ryunosuke Kingetsu providing the screenplay, and Pretty Cure episode animation director Katsumi Tamegai will provide the character designs and animation direction for the film. The voice actresses from Yes! PreCure 5 GoGo! individually expressed their gratitude for their appearance in the film. In February 2021, it was announced that actress Seiran Kobayashi and voice actress Masako Katsuki was cast as Kaguya and Sarena Gashuuin respectively. The film also featured cameo appearances from Nicole Fujita, Meru Nukumi and Hina Kagei.

Release
The film was released in theaters in Japan on March 20, 2021, as a double feature with a 5-minute short film, Tropical-Rouge! Pretty Cure the Movie: Petite Dive! Collaboration Dance Party!.

Reception

Box office
The film debuted at number 4 out of top 10 in the Japanese box office in its opening weekend.

Tropical-Rouge! Pretty Cure the Movie: Petite Dive! Collaboration Dance Party!

 is a 2021 Japanese animated action fantasy short film based on the Pretty Cure franchise created by Izumi Todo, and its eighteenth series, Tropical-Rouge! Pretty Cure. The short is directed by Takashi Otsuka, written by Ryunosuke Kingetsu, and produced by Toei Animation.

The short marks the first film for Tropical-Rouge! Pretty Cure series, and was followed by Tropical-Rouge! Pretty Cure the Movie: The Snow Princess and the Miraculous Ring! (2021).

Plot
Laura presents the Tropical-Rouge! Pretty Cure team: Manatsu, Sango, Minori and Asuka the letter she received from Rabirin, which is an invitation to a dance party, but the Cures realizes that is starts in three minutes, and quickly board the plane. After revealing it to be Yaraneeda, the plane disappears and morphs into a pirate ship, while the Cures fall from the sky. They transform and fights off the Yareneeda. The Cures arrives at the "Dance Party Island", but are exhausted. Laura points out that Healin' Good Pretty Cure team: Cures Grace, Fontaine, Sparkle and Earth is waiting for them at the entrance.

Voice cast
Fairouz Ai as Manatsu Natsuumi/Cure Summer
Yumiri Hanamori as Sango Suzumura/Cure Coral
Yui Ishikawa as Minori Ichinose/Cure Papaya
Asami Seto as Asuka Takizawa/Cure Flamingo
Rina Hidaka as Laura
Aimi Tanaka as Kururun

References

External links
 

2021 anime films
Pretty Cure films
Toei Animation films
Japanese magical girl films
Crossover anime and manga